Varanger Kraft is a municipal owned power company that operates four hydroelectric power stations producing 420 GWh per year through the subsidiary Pasvik Kraft, operates the power grid in the seven owner municipalities in Eastern Finnmark with 3,200 km lines and 16,000 customers, as well as retails power through Barents Energi. Head offices are located in Vadsø.

The company is owned by the municipalities of Sør-Varanger (31.25%), Vadsø (21.88%), Deatnu - Tana (12.50%), Vardø (12.5%), Båtsfjord (9.38%), Berlevåg (6.25%) and Nesseby (6.25%). It operates the power grid in the same municipalities.

History
The company dates back to 1938. It was made a limited company in 1994, and in 2000 it bought the defunct mining company Sydvaranger, that it later sold to Tschudi Group. In 2003 the company was transformed to a corporate model.

Electric power companies of Norway
Companies based in Finnmark
Energy companies established in 1938
Norwegian companies established in 1938
Companies owned by municipalities of Norway
Renewable resource companies established in 1938